Svitlodarsk is a city of district significance in Bakhmut Raion, Donetsk Oblast (province) of Ukraine.

It is an industrial town, built as the home for the Vuhlehirska power station.

In the War in Donbas (that started in the spring of 2014) the city was near the frontline with the separatist Donetsk People's Republic. Because of the conflict, the number of residents has shrunk to a few thousand.

On 24 May 2022, during the 2022 Russian invasion of Ukraine, the city was captured by Russian forces as part of the Battle of Donbas.

Demographics
Native language as of the Ukrainian Census of 2001:
 Russian – 75.0%
 Ukrainian – 24.6%
 Belarusian – 0.1%
 Armenian – 0.1%

See also 
 Battle of Svitlodarsk

References

Cities in Donetsk Oblast
Bakhmut Raion
Populated places established in the Ukrainian Soviet Socialist Republic
Cities of district significance in Ukraine